A nuclear family is a family group consisting of two parents and their children.

Nuclear Family may also refer to:

 "Nuclear Family" (Bugs), a 1997 episode of the British television drama series
 Nuclear Family (comics), a group of supervillains in DC Comics
 "Nuclear Family" (song), by American punk rock band Green Day from their 2012 album ¡Uno!
 Nuclear Family (TV series), 2021 American documentary series by Ry Russo-Young